The Slave Compensation Act 1837 (1 & 2 Vict. c. 3) was an Act of Parliament in the United Kingdom, signed into law on 23 December 1837. It authorised the Commissioners for the Reduction of the National Debt to compensate slave owners in the British colonies of the Caribbean, Mauritius, and the Cape of Good Hope, in the amount of approximately £20 million for freed slaves. Based on a government census of 1 August 1834, over 40,000 awards to slave owners were issued. Since some of the payments were converted into 3.5% government annuities, they lasted until 2015.

History
After decades of campaigning, the Slavery Abolition Act had been passed in 1833. The plantation owners in the Caribbean, represented by the London Society of West India Planters and Merchants (now the West India Committee), had opposed abolition. The 1837 Act paid substantial amount of money constituting 40% of the Treasury’s tax receipts at the time to the former slave owners, but nothing to the liberated people.

The Act empowered the Commissioners for the Reduction of the National Debt, under the direction of the Treasury, to either pay the compensation that was still owing to slave owners out of the West India Compensation Account, or to transfer a proportionate amount of 3.5% government annuities. The various acts of William IV relating to slave compensation were to be considered, as far as applicable, to apply to this act.

Slave owners were paid approximately £20 million in compensation in over 40,000 awards for enslaved people freed in the colonies of the Caribbean, Mauritius and the Cape of Good Hope, according to a government census that named all owners as of 1 August 1834. This represented around 40 per cent of the British Treasury's annual spending budget, and has been calculated as equivalent to around £16.5bn in today's terms. Approximately half went to absentee landlords in the UK, while the rest went to slave-owners in Africa and the West Indies. The largest total amount paid in compensation was to Sir John Gladstone, 1st Baronet, father of prime minister William Gladstone, who was paid £106,769 (today worth £83m) in compensation for losing his 2,508 slaves used across nine plantations.

Payments of the bonds to the descendants of creditors was only finalised in 2015 when the British Government decided to modernise the gilt portfolio by redeeming all remaining undated gilts. The long gap between this money being borrowed and its repayment was due to the type of financial instrument that was used, rather than the amount of money borrowed.

British historian Nicholas Draper in his book, The Price of Emancipation: Slave-Ownership, Compensation and British Society at the End of Slavery, states that, "Nathan Rothschild and his brother-in-law Moses Montefiore led a syndicate underwriting the issue of three new series of securities to raise £15 million: we don’t know how much they distributed or sub-underwrote. A further £5 million was paid out directly in government stock".

Legacy and evaluation
The Slave Compensation Act 1837 was the world's first major act of compensated emancipation.

Chair of the CARICOM Reparations Commission, Sir Hilary Beckles, has pointed out that the taxes of many descendants of slaves in the UK have been used to repay the compensation loan, which he called "the greatest act of political immorality". Many wealthy families in the UK have benefited from the compensation, and today's generations continue to benefit.

The Centre for the Study of the Legacies of British Slave-ownership was created to research the effects of slavery on British history, including the Slave Compensation Act of 1837. University College London set up a project called Legacies of British Slave-ownership which aims to list the individuals who received compensation. They estimate that somewhere between 10 and 20% of Britain's wealthy can be identified as having had links to slavery, ranging in their level of connection. University College London has been pursuing the case with The Centre for the Study of the Legacies of British Slave-ownership at the university.

Since 2018, numerous Freedom of Information Act requests have been sent to the British government and Bank of England for the names of those who were paid with the bonds, of which all were denied.

See also
Emancipation of the British West Indies
Reparations for slavery

References

Further reading
 Accounts of slave compensation claims; for the colonies of Jamaica. Antigua. Honduras. St. Christopher's. Grenada. Dominica. Nevis. Virgin Islands. St. Lucia. British Guiana. Montserrat. Bermuda. Bahamas. Tobago. St. Vincent's. Trinidad. Barbadoes. Mauritius. Cape of Good Hope, House of Commons Parliamentary Papers 1837-8 (215) vol. 48.
Society for the Diffusion of Useful Knowledge. The British Almanac for the year 1839. London, 1839. Table of contents

External links 
1837: 1 Victoria c.3: Slavery Compensation Act
Legacies of British slave-ownership

Slavery Abolition Act 1833
1837 in British law
United Kingdom Acts of Parliament 1837
Slavery legislation